Uwe Gospodarek (born 6 August 1973) is a German footballer coach and former player who played as a goalkeeper. He works as goalkeeper coach for Bundesliga side 1. FC Köln.

Football career
Gospodarek started playing professionally with FC Bayern Munich, but would only manage seven first team appearances during four seasons, being barred by two internationals: first Raimond Aumann, then Oliver Kahn.

Afterwards, he moved to VfL Bochum, helping it move straight from the second division into the UEFA Cup, as he only missed two league matches combined.

After an unassuming stint with 1. FC Kaiserslautern, Gospodarek resumed his career in the regional leagues, with SSV Jahn Regensburg, joining modest second-tier outfit SV Wacker Burghausen in 2003–04. In 2007, he moved to Borussia Mönchengladbach, being released midway through his second season and retired in July 2009, joining former side Wacker Burghausen as goalkeepers' coach.

On 20 December 2009, Gospodarek announced his comeback to active football joining Hannover 96, where he filled the vacant place after the death of Robert Enke. He retired at the end of the 2009–10 campaign, without any appearances.

After retirement
On 8 August 2010, Gospodarek was appointed as the new goalkeeper coach of Germany U21 national team. He left this post in October 2013, and was replaced by Klaus Thomforde.

In July 2012, Gospodarek got the job as youth goalkeeper coach at Bayern Munich. Having worked for VfB Stuttgart since 2019, he signed with 1. FC Köln in the summer of 2021.

Honours
 Bundesliga: 1993–94

References

External links
 

1973 births
Living people
German footballers
Association football goalkeepers
Bundesliga players
2. Bundesliga players
FC Bayern Munich II players
FC Bayern Munich footballers
VfL Bochum players
1. FC Kaiserslautern players
SSV Jahn Regensburg players
SV Wacker Burghausen players
Borussia Mönchengladbach players
Hannover 96 players
Germany under-21 international footballers
FC Bayern Munich non-playing staff
VfB Stuttgart non-playing staff
1. FC Köln non-playing staff
People from Straubing
Sportspeople from Lower Bavaria
Footballers from Bavaria
West German footballers